Cédric Mathy (born 2 February 1970) is a Belgian former cyclist. He competed for Belgium in the 1992 Summer Olympics held in Barcelona, Spain in the points race event where he won the bronze medal.

References

1970 births
Living people
Belgian male cyclists
Olympic cyclists of Belgium
Olympic bronze medalists for Belgium
Cyclists at the 1992 Summer Olympics
Olympic medalists in cycling
People from Ixelles
Medalists at the 1992 Summer Olympics
Cyclists from Brussels